Honeymoon is the debut studio album by American rock band Beach Bunny, released on February 14, 2020, on Mom + Pop Music.

Critical reception

Accolades

Track listing

Personnel
Credits adapted from the album's liner notes.

Beach Bunny
 Lili Trifilio – vocals, guitar, piano, artwork
 Matt Henkels – guitar
 Jon Alvarado – drums
 Anthony Vaccaro – bass

Additional personnel

 Joe Reinhart – production, mixing, engineering
 Ryan Schwabe – stem mastering
 TJ de Blois – drum teaching
 Chris Hoffer – coloration
 NY – layout

Charts

References

Beach Bunny (band) albums
2020 debut albums
Mom + Pop Music albums